Lucky Wahyu Dwi Permana (born 1 April 1990) is an Indonesian professional footballer who plays as a defensive midfielder for Liga 2 club Bekasi City.

Club career

Sulut United
He was signed for Sulut United to play in Liga 2 in the 2020 season. This season was suspended on 27 March 2020 due to the COVID-19 pandemic. The season was abandoned and was declared void on 20 January 2021.

Sriwijaya
In 2021, Lucky Wahyu signed a contract with Indonesian Liga 2 club Sriwijaya.

International career
In 2009, Lucky Wahyu represented the Indonesia U-23, in the 2009 Southeast Asian Games.

References

External links
 Lucky Wahyu at Soccerway
 Lucky Wahyu at Liga Indonesia

1990 births
Living people
Indonesian Muslims
People from Sidoarjo Regency
Sportspeople from East Java
Indonesian footballers
Indonesian Premier League players
Liga 1 (Indonesia) players
Liga 2 (Indonesia) players
Persebaya Surabaya players
PS Barito Putera players
Madura United F.C. players
Persela Lamongan players
Indonesia youth international footballers
Association football midfielders